Mati Airport, formerly Imelda R. Marcos Airport, is an airport that serves the general area of Mati, the capital city of the province of Davao Oriental in the Philippines. It is the only airport in Davao Oriental. 

The airport is classified as a secondary airport by the Civil Aviation Authority of the Philippines, a body of the Department of Transportation (DOTr) that is responsible for the operations of not only this airport but also of all other airports in the Philippines except the major international airports. There are no commercial flights serving Mati. The airport only accommodates chartered flights and light planes.

History
The airport was built in the 1980s under the administration of former Davao Oriental governor Francisco Rabat as a gift to the province by former Philippine president and dictator Ferdinand Marcos and was named after his wife Imelda Marcos. It was built on a  property owned by the Rabat and Rocamora families. Since there is no deeds of donation executed to transfer the associated properties from the two families to the government, the airport could not be used for commercial flights. It was later renamed as the Mati Airport. Around the 2010s, the airport is used by the Mindanao Saga Flying Club to provide aerial views of Mati to tourists.

There were efforts to revive the airport in the late 2010s. By 2019, the DOTr had allocated ₱200 million for the airport development. which include rehabilitation and construction of the runway, fencing, and upgrading of passenger terminal. Renovations were planned to commence in 2020, but was delayed due to the COVID-19 pandemic.

References

Airports in the Philippines
Buildings and structures in Davao Oriental
Transportation in Mindanao